Sam Sing Kung Temple
(also known as the Three Saints Temple) is a Chinese temple in Sandakan, Sabah, Malaysia. Built in 1887, the temple is the third oldest temple in Sandakan, after Goddess of Mercy Temple and Tam Kung Temple. It is part of the Sandakan Heritage Trail.

History 
The temple was built in 1887, and has undergone several recent renovations. The temple was originally established as a religious centre for Chinese migrants who had arrived from Guangdong, Qing Dynasty. It was built by Chinese communities of Cantonese, Teochew, Hakkas and the Hainanese people. The temple are also called as "Three Saints Temple" with the three saints refers to:
 Kwan Woon Cheung – Saint of righteousness.
 Goddess of Tin Hou – Worshipped by fishermen and seamen for protection.
 Min Cheong Emperor – Worshipped by hopeful students who seek success in examinations.

The temple is known as a place for Chinese devotees to come for blessing and divination.

Features 
The temple has a collection of 100 pre-printed Taoist Divination Poems. Its bronze bell was donated by the first Kapitan Cina of Sandakan, known as Fung Ming Shan.  Ming Shan was appointed by the British rulers in 1887 to manage and oversee the Chinese community in the town.

References

External links 
 Picture of Sam Sing Kung Temple
 

Religious buildings and structures completed in 1887
Chinese-Malaysian culture
Taoist temples in Malaysia
Buildings and structures in Sandakan
Tourist attractions in Sabah
Mazu temples